The Anti-Revolutionary Party  (ARP) was a Protestant conservative and Christian democratic political party in the Netherlands. The party was founded in 1879 by Abraham Kuyper, a neo-Calvinist theologian and minister. In 1980 the party merged with the Catholic People's Party (KVP) and the Christian Historical Union (CHU) to form the Christian Democratic Appeal (CDA).

History

History before 1879
The anti-revolutionary parliamentary caucus had existed since the 1840s. It represented orthodox tendencies within the Dutch Reformed Church. Under the leadership of Guillaume Groen van Prinsterer the anti-revolutionaries became a real political force, which opposed the liberal tendencies within the Dutch Reformed Church and the liberal tendencies within Dutch politics. Their three values were "God, the Netherlands, and the House of Orange".

An important issue was public education, which in the view of the anti-revolutionaries should be Protestant-Christian in nature. During the 1860s Groen van Prinsterer became more isolated from his conservative allies. He also began to reformulate his Protestant-Christian ideals, and began to plead for souvereiniteit in eigen kring (sphere sovereignty) instead of theocracy. This meant that instead of one Protestant-Christian society, Groen van Prinsterer wanted a Protestant society within a pluralistic society. Orthodox Protestants would have their own churches, schools, papers, political parties and sports clubs. This laid the basis for pillarisation, which was to dominate Dutch society between 1880 and 1960.

In 1864 Groen van Prinsterer began to correspond with a young Dutch Reformed theologian named Abraham Kuyper. Kuyper was heavily influenced by Groen van Prinsterer's ideas and began to put the latter's ideal of an orthodox Protestant society within Dutch society into practice.

Foundation
On 3 April 1879, Abraham Kuyper founded the ARP as part of the larger separate orthodox Protestant society within society. It was the first nationally organised political party in the Netherlands. An 1878 petition for equal payment for religious schools became one of the catalysts for the foundation of the political movement. In 1877 Kuyper had already written "Our Program" in which the political ideals of the ARP were written down (see below). Around the ARP the separate Protestant society began to grow: many Protestant schools were founded, a Protestant university (the Free University was founded in 1880), and a paper (De Standaard). In 1886 Kuyper broke free from the liberal Dutch Reformed Church (in Dutch: Nederlands-Hervormde Kerk) to found the Reformed Churches in the Netherlands in 1892 (in Dutch: Gereformeerde Kerken Nederland).

The ARP had one practical political goal: equalisation of payment between public and religious schools. It had one political strategy: the Antithesis between religious and non-religious parties, which meant that he sought to break the cooperation between liberals and Catholics and to create an alliance between Catholics and Protestants.

1879–1917

In 1879 thirteen anti-revolutionaries were among the hundred members of the House of Representatives, although not all were members of the ARP. During the period 1879–1883 their numbers grew slowly, peaking at 19. After the 1884 election they had 21 members of parliament. In 1886 they won their first seat in the Senate.

In the 1888 election the ARP won 31.4% of the vote and 27 seats. A confessional cabinet was formed led by the anti-revolutionary Æneas Baron Mackay: it combined anti-revolutionary and Catholic ministers, joined by two conservative independents. Because the liberals still controlled the Senate, many of the cabinet's proposals met resistance there and the cabinet fell before the end of its four-year term.

In the 1891 election the ARP lost 2% of its votes, but six of its seats. The confessional parties also lost their majority. A liberal cabinet, led by Van Tienhoven was formed. It proposed drastic changes to the census, which would result practically in universal male suffrage, proposed by minister Tak. The ARP was divided on the issue: Kuyper and a majority of the parliamentary party voted in favour of the law, while Alexander de Savornin Lohman vehemently opposed it. Kuyper had tactical reasons to support enlarged franchise – the 'kleine luyden' (middle class) who would be allowed to vote often supported the ARP. De Savorin-Lohman opposed the law because it would imply some form of popular sovereignty instead of divine sovereignty. In 1894 this resulted in a split between the ARP and the group around De Savorin-Lohman. Party discipline also played a role in the conflict between Kuyper and De Savorin-Lohman: Kuyper, the party leader, favoured strong party discipline, while De Savorin Lohman opposed strong parties. The split results in the foundation of the Free Anti Revolutionary Party in 1898, which would become the Christian Historical Union in 1904. With De Savorin-Lohman a group of prominent party politicians left the party, including many of its aristocratic members (who like De Savorin-Lohman have double names). The CHU continued its opposition against universal suffrage and was more anti-papist than the ARP.

In the 1894 election the ARP lost almost half of its vote and six of its twenty-one seats. The Catholics broke their alliance with the ARP and supported a conservative cabinet. In the 1897 election the ARP won back some ground: it was supported by 26% of the electorate and won seventeen seats. The group around De Savorin Lohman, won 11% of the vote and six seats. A liberal cabinet was formed and the ARP was confined to opposition.

In 1901 the ARP won a decisive victory. It won 27.4% of the vote and twenty-three seats. A cabinet was formed out of the ARP, the Catholics and the group around De Savorin-Lohman, now called the Christian Historical Party. The cabinet was led by Kuyper, being the first person to formally lead the cabinet for four years. It was characterised by Kuypers' authoritarian leadership. This can best be seen by the railway strike of 1903, in which Kuyper showed no mercy to the strikers and instead pushed several particularly harsh anti-strike laws through parliament. After the Senate, where there was a liberal majority, rejected Kuypers' law on higher education, which sought to bring equal titles for alumni of the Free University, which Kuyper himself founded, Kuyper called for new elections for the Senate. With a confessional majority in the Senate, the law was pushed through.

In the 1905 election the ARP lost only 3% of vote, but eight seats, although it was able to strengthen its position in the Senate. Kuyper, the party's leader, lost his own seat in Amsterdam to a progressive liberal. Theo Heemskerk led the anti-revolutionary parliamentary party. A minority liberal cabinet was formed. Former anti-revolutionary MP Staalman left ARP and founded the Christian Democratic Party, which later became the Christian Democratic Union, which would play a minor role in the interbellum political landscape.

In a 1908 Kuyper returned to the House of Representatives. After a crisis in the liberal cabinet Theo Heemskerk was given the chance to form a new cabinet. A minority confessional cabinet was formed. In the 1909 election the ARP won 3% of vote and twenty-five seats. The Heemskerk cabinet continues.

In 1912 Kuyper left national politics because of health reasons, and in 1913 he was elected to the Senate. In the 1913 election the ARP lost 6% of the votes, but lost more than half of its seats and was left with 11 seats. Another minority liberal cabinet was formed. The leadership of the ARP lay in the hands of less prominent politicians. Although a relatively small opposition party, the ARP played an important role in Dutch politics. The liberal minority cabinet, led by Cort van der Linden sought to resolve two important issues in Dutch politics: the conflict over the equalisation of payment for religious schools and universal suffrage. In the constitution change of 1917 both items were resolved. The ARP was given equal payment for religious schools, but it had to accept women's suffrage and proportional representation.

1917–1945

After the Pacification of 1917, marked by the introduction of universal suffrage, the party never received more than twenty percent of the vote. The 1918 election provided a decisive test for the party, where the party won two additional seats. The three confessional parties won 50 seats. The confessional parties formed a new cabinet, led by the Catholic Charles Ruijs de Beerenbrouck. The ARP supplied three ministers and former prime minister Theo Heemskerk became Minister of Justice. A group of concerned anti-revolutionaries, led by Gerrit Kersten, founded the Reformed Political Party, which opposed universal suffrage and cooperation with the Catholics. The electorate of the ARP changed in the interbellum – the difference between lower class Protestants who voted ARP and middle class Protestant Protestants who voted CHU began to disappear, with religious differences between the Dutch Reformed Church (CHU) and the Reformed Churches in the Netherlands (ARP) becoming more important.

In the 1922 election former minister of war Hendrikus Colijn became the leader of the ARP. He emphasised defence and fiscal conservatism as core issues of the party. With him the ARP got sixteen seats in the House of Representatives and fifteen in the Senate. He became Minister of Finance in the second cabinet of Charles Ruijs de Beerenbrouck. He led the party in the 1925 election and the party lost three seats. The ARP continued in government with Jan Donner as minister of Justice. In the 1929 election the ARP lost another seat. The confessional parties continued to govern.

In the 1930s with the growing international political threats and economic crisis, the ARP began to regain its popularity, under the leadership of Colijn. In 1933, the ARP gained two seats and Colijn formed a broad cabinet comprising the Roman Catholic State Party (RKSP), CHU, ARP, Liberal State Party (LSP) and Free-thinking Democratic League (VDB). Jan Schouten led the party's parliamentary party. Between 1933 and 1939 Colijn led several parliamentary and extra-parliamentary cabinets with changing composition, although the CHU, ARP, and RKSP continued to form the core of the cabinet. Colijn refused to devalue the guilder but was unable to resolve the economic crisis. In 1937 the ARP gained three seats and reached a historic 17 seats. Colijn continued to govern. In 1939 his fifth cabinet fell and Colijn was succeeded by Dirk Jan de Geer. Pieter Gerbrandy joined the cabinet without support of his parliamentary party.

During World War II members of the ARP played a role in both the governments-in-exile, of which many were led by Pieter Sjoerds Gerbrandy and the resistance movements. The resistance paper Trouw was founded by ARP members. Many future ARP MPs began their political career in the Dutch resistance.

1945–1980
After World War II the ARP returned to Dutch politics. The anti-revolutionary Jo Meynen was minister of War, albeit without support of his parliamentary party.

In the 1946 election Jan Schouten led the party. It lost four seats. During the formation in became clear that the ARP could not govern: it strongly opposed the decolonisation of the Dutch Indies. It saw maintenance of the Dutch colonial empire as necessary for the continued wealth and power of the Netherlands. The Labour Party (PvdA) and the Catholics however favoured decolonisation, under heavy pressure from the United States. For six years the ARP was relatively isolated. In 1944 a theological conflict within the Reformed Churches in the Netherlands led to a break between the Reformed Church and the Reformed Churches (liberated). This also had political repercussions, as in 1948 the Reformed Political League was set up by members of the liberated churches. They were unable to win seats until 1963. The party remained stable in the 1948 election and remained in opposition.

After the 1952 election the ARP returned to the cabinet, which consisted of the confessional ARP, CHU, KVP and the social democratic PvdA, led by the social democrat Drees. Jelle Zijlstra became minister of economic affairs. In the 1956 election in which Jelle Zijlstra became political leader the ARP kept its 10% of the vote, but due to the enlargement of the House of Representatives it got 15 seats. A conflict between the PvdA and the KVP caused the early downfall of the cabinet. The ARP remained part of the care-taker cabinet led by Louis Beel. In the 1959 election the ARP lost another seat. It continued to be part of the cabinet, now led by Jan de Quay. The three confessional parties were joined by the conservative liberal People's Party for Freedom and Democracy.

After the 1963 election the cabinet continued, now led by Victor Marijnen. The new anti-revolutionary leader Barend Biesheuvel became Minister of Agriculture. In 1965 this cabinet fell over a conflict between the liberals and the confessionals. The PvdA joins the ARP and the KVP in a new cabinet, led by Jo Cals. This cabinet fell after one year, over conflict between the KVP and PvdA over government spending. The ARP joins the PvdA in its plea for more government spending. A caretaker government is formed by the KVP and ARP, led by former ARP-leader Jelle Zijlstra. In the 1967 election campaign the ARP, CHU and KVP declared that they would continue to govern together. This led to considerable conflict with the KVP, which also spilled over into the ARP, as the younger generation wanted to govern with the PvdA. The ARP gained two seats, but the KVP loses eight seats. A new liberal/confessional cabinet is formed. Biesheuvel does not enter government but instead chooses to remain in parliament.

In the 1971 election the ARP lost two seats, and its confessional allies (KVP and CHU) lost seven and three seats respectively. They faced competition from the left-wing Christian Political Party of Radicals (PPR), which was formed by former KVP members and joined by some prominent anti-revolutionaries, including Bas de Gaay Fortman, son of Wilhelm de Gaay Fortman, one of the party's ministers. The liberal/confessional cabinet lost its majority. A new government was formed consisting of liberals and confessionals, now joined by Democratic Socialists '70, a group of moderate social democrats who left the "radicalising" PvdA. This cabinet was led by Barend Biesheuvel. Willem Aantjes became the chair of the party's parliamentary party. Under his leadership the ARP fashioned itself a new left-wing radical evangelical image, while the CHU retains its conservative image. The cabinet did not hold together for long: DS '70 were unable to agree with proposed budget cuts, and the cabinet fell. In the subsequent election the ARP gained one seat. After long coalition talks several prominent anti-revolutionaries, including Wilhelm de Gaay Fortman, joined the progressive cabinet led by Joop den Uyl. The cabinet was riddled with conflicts between confessional and progressive politicians.

Dissolution
Meanwhile, a process of merger had started between the KVP, ARP and CHU. In 1974 they founded a federation called the Christian Democratic Appeal (CDA). In the formation of a common Christian democratic identity anti-revolutionary Aantjes played a decisive role: he orients the party towards the sermon on the Mount where Christ says that Christians should clothe the naked and feed the hungry. In the 1977 election they campaigned together under as the CDA. Some prominent anti-revolutionaries, like Aantjes did not agree the CDA/VVD cabinet that was formed after the election and wanted to continue with the PvdA. However, they supported the cabinet politically. A group of these anti-revolutionaries left the CDA in 1981 to found the left-wing Christian Evangelical People's Party.

While the ARP was one of the dominant forces in the merged party, it was not until 2002 that a CDA member with anti-revolutionary roots became Prime Minister, Jan Peter Balkenende.

Name
The Anti-Revolutionary Party derived its name from its opposition to the ideals of the liberal French Revolution (and certainly against those of Marxists). The label conservative was already taken by a parliamentary group of monarchists and colonialists, who fell out of favour in the late 19th century. In its early years the terms anti-revolutionary and Christian historical were used interchangeably. With the split between the ARP and the Christian Historical Union the terms began to gain their own separate meanings.

Ideology and issues

The ARP started out as an orthodox Protestant party, heavily opposed to the ideals of the French revolution. Against the revolution, they put the Bible: instead of liberty, it favoured divine providence, instead of equality it favoured hierarchy and instead of brotherhood it favoured sovereignty in its own circle. Its ideals could be summed up in the tripartite motto "God, the Netherlands and the House of Orange". For most of its history it maintained this conservative Protestant image. In the 1960s and 1970s the party began to adopt a more left-wing "radical evangelical" image.

God
The ARP was a confessional Protestant party which based its politics on the Bible and opposed the concept of popular sovereignty.

The concept of sphere sovereignty was very important for the party. It wanted to create an independent Protestant society within the Dutch society, with its own schools, papers, hospitals etc. It sought equal government finances for its own institutions. Societies should care for their own, therefore they opposed a large role for the state in social-economic policy.

The ARP saw an important role for the state in upholding the values of the Dutch people. It was socially conservative: it opposed mixed-sex education, mandatory vaccination, divorce, pornography, euthanasia, abortion etc. It also favoured capital punishment.

Netherlands
The party can be seen as rather nationalist. It favoured a strong defence to retain Dutch neutrality. It opposed decolonisation. It saw the colonies in Indonesia as vital for the continued wealth and influence of the Dutch people. It also wanted to enlighten the native population with Christian values.

Monarchy
The ARP favoured monarchy, and saw the House of Orange as historically and religiously linked to the Dutch people. It opposed changes to Dutch political system, it wanted to retain bicameralism, opposed popular referendums etc. Its commitment to universal suffrage was only tactical as the ARP expected that it would be able to gain more seats this way. Principally it wanted Householder Franchise where the father of each family would vote for his family.

The party was fiscally conservative: the Dutch government should be like a good father: it should not spend more than it got through taxes.

Christian radicalism
In the 1960s and 1970s the party became more left-wing on many issues. Social justice became an important ideal of the party, both nationally, where it began to favour a stronger welfare state, and internationally, where development aid became an important issue.

Representation
This table shows the results of the ARP in elections to the House of Representatives and Senate, as well as the party's political leadership: the fractievoorzitter is the chair of the parliamentary party and the lijsttrekker is the party's top candidate in the general election, these posts are normally taken by the party's leader. If the party is in government, a high ranking minister, often the prime minister can also be party leader. If the high ranking minister is the Prime Minister, this can be seen by the "PM" behind his name. If he is in the cabinet without support of his party his is listed as "independent". The party's membership is also presented in this figure.

Organisation

Leaders

Prime Ministers

 Barend Biesheuvel (1971–1973)
 Jelle Zijlstra (1966–1967)
 Pieter Sjoerds Gerbrandy (1940–1945)
 Hendrikus Colijn (1925–1926, 1933–1939)
 Theo Heemskerk (1908–1913)
 Abraham Kuyper (1901–1905)
 Æneas Mackay (1888–1891)

Leadership

 Party chair
 1975–1980 Hans de Boer
 1973–1975 Jan de Koning
 1968–1973 Antoon Veerman
 1968 Anton Roosjen
 1956–1968 Wiert Berghuis
 1955–1956 Anton Roosjen
 1941–1955 Jan Schouten
 1939–1941 Hendrikus Colijn
 1933–1939 Jan Schouten
 1920–1933 Hendrikus Colijn
 1907–1920 Abraham Kuyper
 1905–1907 Herman Bavinck
 1879–1905 Abraham Kuyper

 Lijsttrekker
 Barend Biesheuvel – 1963, 1967, 1971, 1972
 Jelle Zijlstra – 1956, 1959
 Jan Schouten – 1946, 1948, 1952
 Hendrikus Colijn – 1922, 1925, 1929, 1933, 1937
 Abraham Kuyper – 1918

 Parliamentary leaders in the Senate
 Alexander Idenburg (1922–1924)
 Anne Anema (1925–1926)
 Hendrikus Colijn (1926–1929)
 Anne Anema (1929–1960)
 Wiert Berghuis (1960–1971)
 Gaius de Gaay Fortman (1971–1973)
 Wil Albeda (1973–1977)

 Parliamentary leaders in the House of Representatives
 Abraham Kuyper (1894)
 Jan van Alphen (1894–1896)
 Abraham Kuyper (1896–1901)
 Jan van Alphen (1901–1903)
 Theo Heemskerk (1903–1908)
 Jan Hendrik de Waal Malefijt (1908)
 Abraham Kuyper (1908–1912)
 Gerrit Middelberg (1912–1913)
 Coenraad van der Voort van Zijp (1913–1919)
 Victor Henri Rutgers (1919–1922)
 Hendrikus Colijn (1922–1923)
 Victor Henri Rutgers (1923–1925)
 Theo Heemskerk (1925–1929)
 Hendrikus Colijn (1929–1933)
 Jan Schouten (1933–1956)
 Jelle Zijlstra (1956)
 Sieuwert Bruins Slot (1956–1963)
 Henk van Eijsden (1963)
 Barend Biesheuvel (1963)
 Jan Smallenbroek (1963–1965)
 Bauke Roolvink (1965–1967)
 Barend Biesheuvel (1967–1971)
 Willem Aantjes (1971–1972)
 Barend Biesheuvel (1972–1973)
 Willem Aantjes (1973–1977)

Municipal and provincial government
The party was particularly strong in rural municipal and provincial governments. Especially in Friesland, Overijssel, Zeeland and the Veluwe the party was particularly strong.

Electorate
The electorate of the ARP has seen three decisive shifts, especially in its relation with the CHU, the other Protestant party. Although dates are given here, the changes were gradual.

 Between 1879 and 1917 the ARP appealed to "" (Dutch for the little people), the middle class, farmers, and workers, as a confessional party that favoured universal suffrage.
 Between 1917 and 1967 the ARP appealed to members of the Reformed Churches in the Netherlands.
 Between 1967 and 1977, in the time of secularisation and depillarisation the party was able to appeal to younger generations, as the more left-wing confessional party.

Organisation

National organisation
The party's national secretariat was long housed in the Kuyper House in The Hague. It now houses the national secretariat of the Christian Democratic Appeal.

Linked organisations
The party published the magazine Nederlandse Gedachten ("Dutch Thoughts"). Its youth organisation was the Anti-Revolutionaire Jongeren Studieclubs ("Anti-Revolutionary Youth Studyclubs"). Its scientific institute was the Dr. A. Kuyper foundation.

International organisations
Internationally the ARP was a relatively isolated party. In the European Parliament its members sat in the Christian Democratic faction.

Pillarised organisations
The party had close ties to many Protestant organisations, such as the Reformed Churches in the Netherlands, the Protestant broadcaster NCRV, the employers' organisation NCW, the trade union CNV, and the paper De Standaard and after World War II, the Trouw. Together these organisations formed the Protestant pillar.

Relationships to other parties
Because of the philosophy of Antithesis it has strong links with the Catholic parties (General League/Roman Catholic State Party/Catholic People's Party (KVP) and the Christian Historical Union (CHU). In the period 1879 to 1917 it saw the Liberal Union (LU) as its main opponent. After 1917 it saw the social democratic Social Democratic Workers' Party as its main opponent, and it formed several governments with liberals.

After World War II, the ARP became more isolated because of its position on the decolonisation of the Dutch East Indies. After Indonesia became independent, it joined the Labour Party (PvdA), KVP and the CHU in the cabinet. Links with the KVP were exceptionally good and it governed with the KVP and either the CHU and the PvdA. After the 1960s, calls to govern with the PvdA became stronger.

International comparison
Internationally the ARP was very similar to the Scandinavian Christian Democratic parties (such as the Swedish, Norwegian, Danish and the Finnish Christian Democrats), that are all socially and fiscally conservative, with a social heart. All have their roots in orthodox tendencies within the national church. In its conservative policies the ARP also shared similarities with the UK Conservatives (the paternalistic or moderate conservative wing of that party). Comparing the ARP to an American party is more difficult, but is seemed somewhat close to the moderate wing of the US Republicans (although the ARP was more socially inclined) or the conservative wing of the US Democratic Party.

References

Further reading
 
 "Changing Procedures and Changing Strategies in Dutch Coalition Building" by Hans Daalder. In: Legislative Studies Quarterly Vol. 11, No. 4 (Nov. 1986), pp. 507–531.
 "Conservatism in the Netherlands" by Hermann von der Dunk. In: Journal of Contemporary History, Vol. 13, No. 4 (Oct. 1978), pp. 741–763.

Defunct political parties in the Netherlands
Protestant political parties
Political parties established in 1879
Political parties disestablished in 1980
Confessional parties in the Netherlands
Defunct Christian political parties
Defunct nationalist parties in the Netherlands
Conservative parties in the Netherlands
Monarchist parties in the Netherlands
Organisations based in The Hague
1879 establishments in the Netherlands
1980 disestablishments in the Netherlands
Social conservative parties